Thomas Mulloy was an English professional footballer who played as an outside right.

Career
Mulloy joined Bradford City from Barnoldswick Town in August 1923. He made 2 league appearances for the club. He left the club in July 1924 to play for Morecambe.

Sources

References

Date of birth missing
Date of death missing
English footballers
Barnoldswick Town F.C. players
Bradford City A.F.C. players
Morecambe F.C. players
English Football League players
Association football outside forwards